Zhengzhou Hangkonggang railway station is a railway station in Zhongmu County, Zhengzhou, Henan, China.

Description
According to the plan, the station will become one of the four main passenger stations in Zhengzhou. Upon completion, the station will become the junction and the terminus of the now under construction Zhengzhou–Wanzhou high-speed railway and Zhengzhou–Fuyang high-speed railway, and also serve as the main hub for intercity railways in Henan province. The Zhengzhou–Xinzheng Airport intercity railway was extended to this station on 20 June 2022.

History
Construction began on 29 July 2017 and the final design of station was disclosed to public on 2 August 2018. The railway station opened on 20 June 2022.

Metro station
It is currently served by Chengjiao line of Zhengzhou Metro.

See also
 Zhengzhou railway station
 Zhengzhou East railway station

References

Railway stations in Zhengzhou
Railway stations in China opened in 2022